Salvia lasiocephala is an annual herb that is broadly distributed throughout the tropical Americas.

Notes

lasiocephala
Flora of Colombia